St. Matthew's Cathedral is a Roman Catholic Christian religious building in Khartoum, which is the capital of Khartoum State and Sudan. The cathedral is located on the bank of the Blue Nile, next to the Mac Nimir Bridge. It is the seat of the Archbishop of the Archdiocese of Khartoum, under the patronage of Saint Matthew the Apostle. This building resembles a fairy-tale castle with its various turrets, slender spires and a large rose window.

History
The Apostolic Vicariate of Sudan or Central-Africa was erected here in 1846 under the primacy of Msgr. Annetto Casolani. A small church was built in 1847 to serve as the cathedral church. The Apostolic Vicariate was entrusted in 1872 to the Missionaries of the Sacred Heart, under Saint Daniel Comboni, who was apostolic vicar from 1872 until his death in 1881. 

The city was taken by the Mahdist troups in 1885, who destroyed the church and all missions in the country. The war ended in 1898 with the Battle of Omdurman, and missionary work recommenced the following year. When the British built the modern city of Khartoum as capital of the Anglo-Egyptian Sudan, a new cathedral was constructed. It was completed in 1908 in  neo-Romanesque style, featuring three naves and a high tower.

See also
Roman Catholicism in Sudan

References

Roman Catholic cathedrals in Sudan
Buildings and structures in Khartoum
Roman Catholic churches completed in 1909
1846 establishments in Egypt
Religious organizations established in 1908
20th-century Roman Catholic church buildings